Tau Geminorum, Latinized from τ Geminorum, is a star in the northern zodiac constellation of Gemini. It has the apparent visual magnitude of +4.42, making it visible to the naked eye under suitably good seeing conditions.

It is an evolved giant star of the spectral type K2 III. It has double the mass of the Sun and has expanded to 27 times the Sun's radius. Tau Geminorum is radiating 224 as much radiation as the Sun from its expanded outer atmosphere at an effective temperature of 4,528 K, giving it the characteristic orange-hued glow of a K-type star.

This star has a brown dwarf or Super-Jupiter companion designated Tau Geminorum b, whose mass is at least 20.6 Jupiter masses. It was discovered in 2004 by Mitchell and colleagues, who also discovered Nu Ophiuchi b at the same time. This brown dwarf takes  to revolve around Tau Gem.

References

K-type giants
Brown dwarfs

Gemini (constellation)
Geminorum, Tau
Durchmusterung objects
Geminorum, 46
054719
034693
2697